Nasser Hussain or Hussein may refer to:

 Nasser Hussain (born 1968), the England cricketer
 Nasser Hussain (rugby)
 Hussein ibn Nasser, Prime Minister of Jordan from 1963 to 1964
 Abdelkarim Hussein Mohamed Al-Nasser, the alleged Saudi terrorist
 Nasir Hussain Producer/Director
 Nasir Hossain, Bangladeshi cricketer
 Nasir Hossain (Sylhet cricketer)
 Nasir Hussain, Bollywood film producer

See also 
 Nazir Hussain, Bollywood actor